Nokia Asha 205 is a mobile phone from Nokia part of the Asha family. It is a full QWERTY device with a dedicated physical Facebook button, similar to the HTC ChaCha. It was announced alongside the Nokia 206 in November 2012 and was released in March 2013. The Nokia Asha 205 was succeeded by the Nokia Asha 310.

See also
 List of Nokia products

References 

Asha 205